Anton-Maria Del Chiaro (born between 1660 and 1680) was a Florentine Italian secretary of Constantin Brancoveanu, the Prince of Wallachia.

He is the author of a book on the history of Wallachia of his time, called Istoria delle moderne rivoluzioni della Valachia ("History of Modern Revolutions of Walachia"), dedicated to Pope Clement XI, written in Italian, and printed in Venice in 1718.

External links
Anton Maria Del Chiaro: Revoluţiile Valahiei (Romanian)

17th-century births
18th-century deaths
18th-century Italian historians
Historians of Romania